The first season of the Mexican television series Rosario Tijeras, created by Adriana Pelusi and Carlos Quintanilla, follows the story  of a beautiful woman, from one of the poorest and most dangerous neighborhoods in Mexico City. The season premiered on 30 October 2016 and concluded on 30 January 2017. Production of the season began in July 2016.

In the United States the season premiered on 27 June 2017 on Univision, and later moved to UniMás due to low ratings, where it concluded on 24 September 2017.

Plot 
This is the story of a beautiful young woman, victim of an abuse that marked her life and made her develop a dark vision of love. Constantly battered, harassed and assaulted by those around her, she becomes the legendary and deadly "Rosario Tijeras", a dangerous woman, born of the slums. When she meets two boys from a higher social class, she falls in love with both of them. Though she lives worlds apart from their wealth and luxury, her beauty and street smarts prove irresistible as she pulls them into her subculture of violence, revenge, and danger.

Cast

Main 
 Bárbara de Regil as Rosario Tijeras
 José María de Tavira as Antonio Bethancourt
 Antonio Gaona as Emilio Echegaray
 Hernán Mendoza as León Elías Arteaga
 Vanessa Bauche as Ruby
 Christian Vázquez as Ferney / Fierro
 José Sefami as Gonzalo González / El General
Daniela Soto Brenner as Delia
 Ariel López Padilla as Camilo Echegaray
 Hugo Albores as Cristóbal
 Sophie Gómez as Marta de Bethancourt
 Rocío Verdejo as Susana
 María Fernanda Quiroz as Yolanda
 Ariana Ron Pedrique as Paula Restrepo
 Pakey Vázquez as Tobías
 Dino García as Leonardo
 Alexa Martin as Leticia Bethancourt
 Pia Watson as Samantha
 Pascacio López as El Peludo
 Ruy Senderos as Damián González
 Eduardo Victoria as Luis Enrique Bethancourt
 Luis Alberti as Brandon López Morales

Recurring 
 Erick Chapa as Juan José
 Luz Ramos as Rocío
 Giuseppe Gamba as Sudarsky
 Alonso Espeleta as Chávez

Episodes

References 

2016 Mexican television seasons